Godobjiran is a town in the northeastern Nugal province of Somalia. It is the center of the Godobjiran District in the autonomous Puntland region.

Education
Godobjiran has a number of academic institutions. According to the Puntland Ministry of Education, there are 7 primary schools in the Godobjiran District. Among these are Wargudud, Jiifle, Dhinowda and Godobjiran Primary.

Economy

In March 2015, the Ministry of Labour, Youth and Sports in conjunction with the European Union and World Vision launched the Nugal Empowerment for Better Livelihood Project in the Godobjiran, Garowe, Dangorayo, Eyl and Burtinle districts of Puntland. The three-year initiative is valued at $3 million EUR, and is part of the New Deal Compact for Somalia. It aims buttress the regional economic sector through business support, training and non-formal education programs, community awareness workshops, and mentoring and networking drives.

Somali Civil War
In March 2015, it was taken over by Al-Shabaab. However this did not last long, as the territory was taken over by Puntland security forces.

Notes

References
Godob Jiraan/Godobjiraan, Somalia

Populated places in Nugal, Somalia